Otzem is a moshav in southern Israel. Located in Hevel Lakhish, it falls under the jurisdiction of Lakhish Regional Council.

History
The moshav was founded in 1955 by Jewish immigrants from Morocco as part of the effort to settle the region on land that had belonged to the depopulated Palestinian  village of Iraq Suwaydan. The name, which means "intensity", refers to the intensity of the battles that took place here between the Israel Defense Forces and the Egyptian army during the 1948 Arab–Israeli War.

References

Moshavim
Lakhish Regional Council
Populated places established in 1955
Populated places in Southern District (Israel)
1955 establishments in Israel
Moroccan-Jewish culture in Israel